Robert Tobias Andrews (born Reginald Frank Andrews; 20 February 1895 – 17 January 1976) was a British stage and film actor. He is perhaps best known as the long-term companion of Ivor Novello.

Early life 
Andrews was born in Camden Town, the son of Walter Andrews (1861–1935), a horse bus inspector, and his wife Ada Harriet, née Judd (1864–1946). He was the younger brother of actress Maidie Andrews.

Career 
Andrews began his stage acting career at age eleven. He made his first stage appearance in the play Shore Acres in 1906. His child actor contemporaries included Noël Coward and Philip Tonge. Coward referred to Andrews as Tonge's "only serious rival" among the "boy actors" of the London theatre.

In 1907, at the age of twelve, Andrews appeared in Horace Annesley's comedy Her Son as "Min, the eight-year-old child of Crystal and Gasgoyne," a role for which he received significant acclaim. Andrews' "finished and sympathetic performance" was described as "the success of [Her Son's] première," "a genuine and surprising triumph" that caused "quite a sensation." In 1911, he briefly worked in Chicago, acting in the play The Backsliders, before returning to London theatre.

His stage career continued into adulthood with performances as Marcel in the 1920 production of The Children's Carnival, Maurice Avery in the 1920 production of Columbine, and Tyltyl in the 1921 production of The Betrothal. In 1921, he appeared as Charles Deburau in the play Deburau; Deburau also featured Andrews's lover Ivor Novello's debut performance. Andrews starred in a number of Novello's theater productions, beginning with the play Fresh Fields in 1932. Amongst his many character parts was the Prime Minister in Ivor Novello's musical play King's Rhapsody at the Theatre Royal, Drury Lane.

While he was primarily a stage actor, Andrews also made several film appearances. In 1923, he acted in the silent film Fires of Innocence as Pen Arkwright. His co-star Joan Morgan later claimed that she did not remember anything about her time working on the film, except for Andrews. She described how, during a "love-scene," Andrews would not look at her because he claimed he didn't "feel a bit in the mood to see [her]."

Personal life
Andrews first met Ivor Novello in 1916, while Novello was attending the opera with his friend Edward Marsh. Andrews and Novello eventually became lovers. Andrews was also responsible for introducing Novello to Noël Coward in 1916, at Coward's request. Andrews and Novello both had relations with other men over the course of their long-term relationship, but Andrews remained Novello's primary companion until Novello's death in 1951.

Death 
Andrews died in 1976 at his family home, 37 St Mary's Mansions, Paddington.

Stage credits

Filmography

References

External links

1895 births
1976 deaths
English male stage actors
English male film actors
English gay actors
People from Camden Town
20th-century English male actors
20th-century English LGBT people